The Footwork FA13 was a Formula One car used by the Footwork Arrows team in the 1992 Formula One season and was updated to become FA13B for the first two races of the 1993 Formula One season. It was powered by the Mugen Honda V10 engine.

The FA13 chassis, designed by Alan Jenkins, was a conventional, straightforward car and Alboreto scored four times, 5th in both the Spanish and San Marino Grands Prix and 6th in both the Brazilian and Portuguese Grands Prix, the team finishing with six points and equal 7th with Ligier in the Constructors' Championship.

Complete Formula One results
(key)

* All 1993 points were scored using the Footwork FA14

References

FA13